An award recognizing outstanding accomplishments in one or more of the areas of biochemistry, biophysical chemistry, biophysics, or chemical biology.  The award is given by the journal Biopolymers, and is named for the journal’s founding editor. 

The award consists of a symposium given at the Spring Meeting of the American Chemical Society, a dinner in recognition of the recipient, an invitation to write a review article for Biopolymers and a cash prize.

Recipients

See also

 List of chemistry awards

References

Awards of the American Chemical Society